Ochronectria is a genus of fungi in the class Sordariomycetes.

References

Hypocreales genera
Bionectriaceae
Taxa described in 1999